Hatcher is an unincorporated community in Taylor County, Kentucky, United States.  It lies along Route 55 south of the city of Campbellsville, the county seat of Taylor County.  Its elevation is 820 feet (250 m).

References

Unincorporated communities in Taylor County, Kentucky
Unincorporated communities in Kentucky